Alpine Antics is a 1936 black-and-white Looney Tunes animated cartoon short directed by Jack King. The film stars Porky Pig and Beans the Cat.

Plot
Beans and Little Kitty are riding on a sled through the snow. On the way, they see a poster which promotes a money-rich skiing contest. Beans wants to give it a shot as he puts on his gear. Just then, a large oppressive cougar overhears Beans, approaches him, takes his skis off and breaks them before walking away. Beans still wants to participate and removes the rails from his sled using them as substitute skis.

Moments later, the contest begins and all the competitors met at the starting line. Everyone sets off but the cougar has made Beans have a slow start. Nevertheless, Beans still makes his move and catches up, avoiding the cougar's further trickery as he puts all other contestants out of the race. Finally it's just the cougar and Beans. As they approach the finishing line, the cougar is hurled onto thin ice and falls into the water below. Beans makes it safely across the finish line and wins the contest.

Home media
 Looney Tunes Golden Collection: Volume 5
 Porky Pig 101 DVD, restored version.

References

External links
 
 

1936 films
American black-and-white films
American chase films
Films scored by Norman Spencer (composer)
Films directed by Jack King
Looney Tunes shorts
Warner Bros. Cartoons animated short films
American skiing films
Beans the Cat films
Porky Pig films
Animated films about cats
1936 animated films
1930s chase films
1930s action films
1936 short films
1930s sports films
1930s Warner Bros. animated short films
Films about pigs
Films about cougars